Adriana Ruano (born 26 June 1995) is a Guatemalan sports shooter. She competed in the women's trap event at the 2020 Summer Olympics.

References

External links
 

1995 births
Living people
Guatemalan female sport shooters
Olympic shooters of Guatemala
Shooters at the 2020 Summer Olympics
Sportspeople from Guatemala City
Guatemalan female artistic gymnasts
21st-century Guatemalan women